Dimitrie is the Romanian form of a Slavic given name. Notable persons with that name include:

First name
 Dimitrie Alexandresco (1850–1925), Romanian encyclopedist
 Dimitrie Anghel (1872–1914), Romanian poet
 Dimitri Atanasescu (1836–1907), Aromanian teacher commonly referred to as Dimitrie Atanasescu
 Dimitrie Bogos (1889–1946), Romanian politician
 Dimitrie Bolintineanu (1819–1872), Romanian poet, diplomat, politician, and revolutionary
 Dimitrie Brândză (1846–1895), Romanian botanist
 Dimitrie Brătianu (1818–1892), Romanian politician, Prime Minister of Romania in 1881 
 Dimitrie Cantemir (1673–1723), Prince of Moldavia 
 Dimitrie Călugăreanu (1868-1937), Romanian physician and naturalist
 Dimitrie Cărăuş (born 1892), a Bessarabian politician, member of the Moldovan Parliament (1917–1918)
 Dimitrie Comșa (1846-1931), Romanian agronomer and activist
 Dimitrie Cornea (1816–1884), Romanian politician, and diplomat
 Dimitrie Cozacovici (1790–1868), Romanian historian
 Dimitrie Cuclin (1885–1978), Romanian classical music composer, musicologist, philosopher, translator, and writer
 Demetru Dem. Demetrescu-Buzău, Romanian writer Urmuz (1883–1923)
 Dimitrie Drăghicescu (1875–1945), Romanian politician, sociologist, diplomat and writer
 Dimitrie Dragomir (1884–?), Bessarabian politician
 Dimitrie Dron (born 1892), a Bessarabian politician, member of the Moldovan Parliament (1917–1918)
 Dimitrie Gerota (1867–1939), Romanian anatomist, physician, radiologist, and urologist
 Dimitrie Ghica (1816–1897), Romanian politician, Prime Minister of Romania 1868-1870
 Dimitrie Ghica-Comăneşti (1839–1923), Romanian nobleman, explorer, hunter, and politician
 Dimitrie I. Ghika (1875–1967), Romanian politician and diplomat
 Dimitrie Gusti (1880–1955), Romanian sociologist, ethnologist, historian, and voluntarist philosopher
 Dimitrie Ivanov (1944–1998), Romanian Olympic sprint canoer 
 Dimitrie Leonida (1883–1965), engineer, professor, founder of Dimitrie Leonida Technical Museum
 Dimitrie Lovcinski, a Moldovan politician, served as the mayor of Chişinău between 1825 and 1830
 Dimitrie Macedonski (c. 1780–1843), Wallachian soldier and revolutionary leader
 Dimitrie Maimarolu (1859–1926), Romanian architect
 Dimitrie Onciul (1856–1923), Romanian historian
 Dimitrie Paciurea (1873–1932), Romanian abstract sculptor
 Dimitrie Panaitescu Perpessicius pen name of Dumitru S. Panaitescu (1891–1971)
 Dimitrie Pompeiu (1873–1954), Romanian mathematician
 Dimitrie Popescu (born 1961), Romanian Olympic rower
 Dimitrie Prelipcean (1927–1987), Romanian writer, historian
 Dimitrie Sturdza (1833–1914), Romanian statesman, president of the Romanian Academy 1882-1884

Middle name
 Alexandru Dimitrie Xenopol (1847–1920), Romanian scholar, economist, philosopher, historian, professor, sociologist, and author
 Barbu Dimitrie Ştirbei (1796 or 1801–1869), Prince of Wallachia

See also
 Dimitar, given name
 Dmitry, given name
 Dumitru, a variant

Romanian masculine given names